John Rogers (born 7 May 1943) is an Australian former cricketer. He played four first-class and one List A matches for New South Wales between 1968/69 and 1969/70.

See also
 List of New South Wales representative cricketers

References

External links
 

1943 births
Living people
Australian cricketers
New South Wales cricketers
People from Gosford
Cricketers from New South Wales